Borcherds may refer to:

 Richard Borcherds, a British mathematician 
 Borcherds, a suburb of George, South Africa